Baiyi Ancient Town is a famous water town in Pingchang County, Bazhong, Sichuan, China. It is also one of the tourist destinations summarized by the Pingchang government, covering an area of 23 square kilometers.

References

Pingchang County